Marcus Sieger (born 7 October 1975) is a German wheelchair curler.

He competed with the German wheelchair curling team at the 2010 Winter Paralympic Games in Vancouver, British Columbia, Canada.

References

External links
 
 
 

1975 births
Living people
German male curlers
German wheelchair curlers
Paralympic wheelchair curlers of Germany
Wheelchair curlers at the 2010 Winter Paralympics
Place of birth missing (living people)